Aboukir is type of a dessert make with a sponge cake that has been baked in a Charlotte mold, divided into multiple layers which are layered with chestnut cream. The assembled dessert is iced with coffee-flavoured fondant and decorated with a garnish of chopped pistachios. According to Larousse Gastronomique the dessert is of French origins. A frozen variation with pistachio ice cream is called an Aboukir bombe.

Aboukir almonds are a type of petit four made with marzipan colored pink or green, with an almond in the center and glazed with boiled sugar or caramel. Aboukir is a region in Egypt where the almond production used to take place. The almonds were exported to Europe from the Aboukir port.

See also 
 Princess cake
 Swedish Cuisines

References 

Almond dishes
Sponge cakes
Layer cakes
French cakes
Chestnut dishes